Dan Kent Armstrong (October 7, 1934  June 8, 2004) was an American guitarist, luthier, and session musician.

Biography

Armstrong was born in Pittsburgh, Pennsylvania. He started playing the guitar at age 11, and moved to New York in the early 1960s in order to work as a studio musician and guitar repairman. In 1965 he opened his own guitar repair shop, 'Dan Armstrong's Guitar Service', on West 48th Street. The building was razed in 1968, and Armstrong relocated his shop, renamed 'Dan Armstrong Guitars', to 500 Laguardia Place in Greenwich Village.

In 1968 the Ampeg Company of Linden, New Jersey hired Armstrong as a consultant to improve their Grammer line of guitars.  He designed a new line of guitars and basses that were constructed of clear Plexiglas. These guitars had interchangeable pickups designed by Bill Lawrence who shared the Greenwich Village shop with Armstrong, and eventually took it over when Armstrong moved to London. The guitars had long sustain caused by the solid Plexiglas body, though that material made for a heavy guitar—around 10 lbs. There was a reissue, made in Japan, in 1998, where the reissue was compared to the 1968 original, as being identical. A second reissue of the Dan Armstrong guitar was launched in 2006.

Armstrong moved to London in the early 1970s where he developed a new line of electric instruments, amplifiers and effects boxes. The Dan Armstrong London instruments were made of solid Honduran mahogany with sliding low impedance pickups, available as a six string guitar, and short-scale and long-scale basses. Armstrong also marketed a line of tube guitar and bass amplifiers and effects boxes, the Blue Clipper, Yellow Humper, Red Ranger, Purple Peaker, Green Ringer and Orange Squeezer.

In 1977 Armstrong and his wife, Vicki O'Casey, moved back to the United States. A licensing and manufacturing agreement was reached with Musitronics to re-release the effects boxes. Armstrong also developed a line of pickups for Schecter Guitar Research, a new amplifier for Fender. The couple returned to England, where they lived in Ashford, Kent, in the late 1990s, but again moved back to America after several years. After suffering from emphysema for many years, Armstrong died from a combination stroke and heart attack in Los Angeles on June 8, 2004.

Armstrong effects boxes continue to be made under license from his son, Kent Armstrong, who is also a maker of guitar pickups.

List of artists
Chett Lehrer of LA's Wasted Youth exclusively from 1980-1987
 Randy Jo Hobbs of Johnny Winter and The McCoys and Montrose played the Dan Armstrong Bass in 1970.
 Keith Richards of The Rolling Stones
 John Kay of Steppenwolf 
 Cyril Jordan of Flamin' Groovies
 Poison Ivy of The Cramps
 Randy California of Spirit
 Arthur Lee of Love (band)  
 Lou Reed and Sterling Morrison of the Velvet Underground, lead overdubs on the LP 'Loaded'
 David Bowie
 Todd Tamanend Clark  
 Steve Miller of The Steve Miller Band
 Greg Ginn of Black Flag (Played a Dan Armstrong almost exclusively during Black Flag)
 Earl Slick
 Kyle Toucher of Dr. Know
 Dave Grohl of Foo Fighters
 Ant Forbes of Vex Red
 Paul McCartney of The Beatles (owns the only left-handed Dan Armstrong guitar)
 Phil Lynott of Thin Lizzy
 Randy Rhoads of Quiet Riot (owned by Kevin DuBrow)
 Ronnie Wood of Faces and The Rolling Stones
 Ronnie Lane of Faces
 Rick Richards of The Georgia Satellites and Izzy Stradlin and the Ju Ju Hounds
 Buzz Osborne of The Melvins
  Arlen Roth 
 Joe Perry of Aerosmith (with an A bass string where the low E string goes with an Open A tuning for sliding which he uses for "Draw the Line")
 Nile Rodgers of Chic
 Matthew Bellamy of Muse, only in the Supermassive Black Hole music video
 Leslie West of Mountain
 Bill Wyman of The Rolling Stones
 Scott Hill, Bob Balch and Brad Davis of Fu Manchu
 George Kooymans of Golden Earring
 Brent Hinds of Mastodon
 Rich Robinson of The Black Crowes
 Justin Hawkins of The Darkness
 John Davis of Superdrag
 Stephen Egerton (guitarist) of Descendents (band) & ALL (band)
 Steve "Stevenson" Borek and Mike Neider (guitarists) of Bl'ast (band)
 Dr. Matt Destruction (Bassist) of The Hives, only in the video "Go Right Ahead Live broadcast from RMV"
 Francis Monkman of Curved Air
 Charlie Starr of Blackberry Smoke
 Josh Homme of Queens of the Stone Age
 Lars Frederiksen of Rancid
 Tom Keifer of Cinderella
 Justin Trosper of Unwound
 Justin Pearson of The Locust
 Mike Lewis of Lostprophets
 Jack Bruce of Cream
 Geezer Butler of Black Sabbath
 Jesse F. Keeler of Death From Above 1979
 Olly Smith of The Vigil
 John Frusciante of Red Hot Chili Peppers in Dani California MV
 Jack Sherman of Red Hot Chili Peppers
 Jeff LaBar of Cinderella
 John Zdravecky of Love Affair

Carly Simon
Armstrong had an affair with Carly Simon  until around 1971. He is the subject of the song "Dan My Fling" from her 1971 debut album and has been reported by some to be the subject (or one of the subjects) of her 1972 song "You're So Vain". In 2010, in relation to a suggestion that David Geffen was the subject of "You're So Vain", Simon stated that when she released the song she had not yet met Geffen.

Bibliography
 Tony Bacon, The Ultimate Guitar Book, New York, Alfred A. Knopf, 1997. 
 Tony Bacon, Dave Burrluck, Paul Day, and Michael Wright, Electric Guitars: The Illustrated Encyclopedia, Thunder Bay Press, 2006.
 Gregg Hopkins and Bill Moore, Ampeg: The Story Behind the Sound, Milwaukee, Hal Leonard, 1999.

References

External links

1934 births
2004 deaths
American session musicians
Guitar makers
People from Lakewood, Ohio
20th-century American musicians
Musicians from Pittsburgh